In nuclear fusion power research, a divertor is a device within a tokamak or a stellarator that allows the online removal of waste material from the plasma while the reactor is still operating. This allows control over the buildup of fusion products in the fuel, and removes impurities in the plasma that have entered into it from the vessel lining.

The divertor was initially introduced during the earliest studies of fusion power systems in the 1950s. It was realized early on that successful fusion would result in heavier ions being created and left in the fuel (the so-called "fusion ash"). These impurities were responsible for the loss of heat, and caused other effects that made it more difficult to keep the reaction going. The divertor was proposed as a solution to this problem. Operating on the same principle as a mass spectrometer, the plasma passes through the divertor region where heavier ions are flung out of the fuel mass by centrifugal force, colliding with some sort of absorber material, and depositing its energy as heat. Initially considered to be a device required for operational reactors, few early designs included a divertor.

When early long-shot reactors started to appear in the 1970s, a serious practical problem emerged. No matter how tightly constrained, plasma continued to leak out of the main confinement area, striking the walls of the reactor core and causing multiple problems. A major concern was sputtering in reactors with higher power and particle flux density, which caused ions of the vacuum chamber's wall metal to flow into the fuel and to cool it.

During the 1980s it became common for reactors to include a feature known as the limiter, which is a small piece of material that projects a short distance into the outer edge of the main plasma confinement area. Ions from the fuel that are travelling outwards strike the limiter,
thereby protecting the walls of the chamber from this damage. However, the problems with material being deposited into the fuel remained;
the limiter simply changed where that material was coming from.

This led to the re-emergence of the divertor, as a device for protecting the reactor itself. In these designs, magnets pull the lower edge of the plasma to create a small region where the outer edge of the plasma, the "Scrape-Off Layer" (SOL), hits a limiter-like plate.
The divertor improves on the limiter in several ways, mainly because modern reactors try to create plasmas with D-shaped cross-sections ("elongation" and "triangularity") so the lower edge of the D is a natural location for the divertor. In modern examples the plates are replaced by lithium metal, which better captures the ions and causes less cooling when it enters the plasma.

In ITER and the latest configuration of Joint European Torus, the lowest region of the torus is configured as a divertor, while Alcator C-Mod was built with divertor channels at both top and bottom.

A tokamak featuring a divertor is known as a divertor tokamak or divertor configuration tokamak. In this configuration, the particles escape through a magnetic "gap" (separatrix), which allows the energy absorbing part of the divertor to be placed outside the plasma.
The divertor configuration also makes it easier to obtain a more stable H-mode of operation. The plasma facing material in the divertor faces significantly different stresses compared to the majority of the first wall.

See also
Nuclear fusion
ITER

References

Further reading
 Snowflake and the multiple divertor concepts. March 2016

External links
Limiters
Divertors

Fusion power